Marta Balletbò-Coll (born 1960, L'Hospitalet de Llobregat) is a Catalan actress, film director, producer, screenwriter and cinematographer.

Biography 
Balletbò-Coll earned a degree in analytical chemistry from the Faculty of Chemistry of the University of Barcelona, and later worked as a journalist from 1982 to 1986. She subsequently worked as a translator in the United States, where she earned a Master's degree in cinematography from Columbia University in New York City on a Fulbright-LaCaixa scholarship.

Cinematographic career 
After Balletbò-Coll worked in multiple American advertising agencies, she founded Costabrava Films with Ana Simón Cerezo, with their first movie, Costa Brava, being released in 1995, which was very successful at Frameline Film Festival.

In 2006, she was awarded with the National Film Award of Catalonia, granted by the Generalitat de Catalunya for the production of her film Sévigné. The film also won the grand prix of the Créteil International Women's Film Festival in 2006.

Filmography 

 2004: Sévigné
 1998: Cariño, he enviado los hombres a la luna!
 1995: Costa Brava
 1992: Intrepidíssima (short film)
 1991: Harlequin Exterminator (short film)

Awards 

 Butaca Awards

 Paris Lesbian and Feminist Film Festival

References

External links 
 
 Her profile on culturalianet.com
 Article about her in gaybarcelona.com

1960 births
Living people
People from L'Hospitalet de Llobregat
Film actresses from Catalonia
Film directors from Catalonia
Spanish LGBT screenwriters
LGBT film directors
LGBT actresses
Spanish film producers
University of Barcelona alumni
Columbia University School of the Arts alumni
Spanish women screenwriters